Omega Psi Phi (ΩΨΦ) is an international historically Black fraternity. Founded on November 17, 1911 at Howard University in Washington, D.C., Omega Psi Phi has chartered chapters at various colleges, universities and cities.  The following is a comprehensive list of its chapters throughout the world.
As an international organization, Omega Psi Phi is geographically divided into 13 districts with over 750 chapters collectively. The fraternity has reserved the designation Omega chapter as a memorial to brothers who are deceased.

Chapters in the United States

Single letter chapters

Chapters beginning with "Alpha"

Chapters beginning with "Beta"

Chapters beginning with "Gamma"

Chapters beginning with "Delta"

Chapters beginning with "Epsilon"

Chapters beginning with "Zeta"

Chapters beginning with "Eta"

Chapters beginning with "Theta"

Chapters beginning with "Iota"

Chapters beginning with "Kappa"

Chapters beginning with "Lambda"

Chapters beginning with "Mu"

Chapters beginning with "Nu"

Chapters beginning with "Xi"

Chapters beginning with "Omicron"

Chapters beginning with "Pi"

Chapters beginning with "Rho"

Chapters beginning with "Sigma"

Chapters beginning with "Tau"

Chapters beginning with "Upsilon"

Chapters beginning with "Phi"

Chapters beginning with "Chi"

Chapters beginning with "Psi"

Chapters beginning with "Omega"

International Chapters

References

Omega Psi Phi
chapters